Pete Sampras was the defending champion but did not compete that year.

Boris Becker won in the final 6–4, 7–6(7–3) against Stefan Edberg.

Seeds
The top eight seeds received a bye to the second round.

  Thomas Muster (semifinals)
  Boris Becker (champion)
  Goran Ivanišević (third round)
  Wayne Ferreira (semifinals)
  Michael Stich (quarterfinals)
  Todd Martin (quarterfinals)
  Mark Woodforde (quarterfinals)
  Andrea Gaudenzi (second round)
  Guy Forget (second round)
  Petr Korda (third round)
  Daniel Vacek (first round)
  Jason Stoltenberg (first round)
  Todd Woodbridge (third round)
  Stefan Edberg (final)
  Adrian Voinea (first round)
  Javier Frana (first round)

Draw

Finals

Top half

Section 1

Section 2

Bottom half

Section 3

Section 4

External links
 1996 Stella Artois Championships draw

1996 Stella Artois Championships